New Escapologist was a UK-based lifestyle magazine between 2007 and 2017, now continued online as subscription essays. The magazine and the current essay series take the stance that work has too central a position in western life and that work, consumption and pursuit of social status too often take precedence over happiness, liberty, and unstructured leisure. Simple living, creativity and Epicureanism are offered as solutions to the problems of overwork and overconsumption.

History
New Escapologist was founded in 2007. Speaking at a public event together in 2009, Robert Wringham told Tom Hodgkinson that he started New Escapologist after reading Hodgkinson's book How to be Free alongside a biography of Houdini and Among the Bohemians: experiments in living by Virginia Nicholson.

A pilot issue was printed in 2007, a first canonical issue in 2008, and a launch party was held at the Glasgow CCA in 2009.

In 2011, New Escapologist organized a zine fair in support of the student occupation of Heatherington House at the University of Glasgow. The same year saw the launch of a fifth issue at The Arches theatre and nightclub, and a sixth issue at the Edinburgh Festival Fringe.

In 2014, around the time of the magazine's tenth issue, a spin-off book written by Wringham was announced. Following a successful crowdfunding campaign, the book was published by Unbound on 28 January 2016 followed by a German edition published by Heyne Verlag later that same year.

In 2017, it was announced that the magazine would close after a decade but would continue online as a subscription essay series mediated by Patreon. The first of these essays went live in April 2017.

Production
The magazine's distinct typography, according to a colophon printed in the back of each issue, was achieved using Donald Knuth's TeX typesetting system with a layout based on an ancient Ge'ez liturgical text seen at the Matenadaran Manuscripts Museum in Armenia.

The magazine's logo, featured prominently in the masthead of early issues and at the magazine's website is the ISO standard "running man" symbol usually seen on exit signs.

Notable contributors

 Alain de Botton, philosopher
 Luke Rhinehart, author of The Dice Man
 Ewan Morrison, author of Tales from the Mall
 Richard Herring, comedian
 Tom Hodgkinson, author and editor of The Idler
 Dave Thompson, comedian and tellytubby
 Joshua Glenn, author of The Wage Slave's Glossary
 Judith Levine, journalist and NWU founder
 Ian Macpherson, comedian
 Dickon Edwards, musician and diarist
 Jacob Lund Fisker, blogger
 Aislínn Clarke, movie and theater director
 Graham Fulton, poet

 Landis Blair, illustrator and comic artist
 Seth, cartoonist and book designer
 Leo Babauta, blogger and author of Zen Habits
 Stanley Cohen, London School of Economics-based Sociologist
 Mr. Money Mustache, financial blogger
 Lord Whimsy, designer and dandy
 Caitlin Doughty, author and mortician
 David Cain, blogger
 Steven Rainey, BBC Radio Ulster DJ
 Ellie Harrison, artist and political activist 
 Joseph Heath, University of Toronto philosopher and economics writer
 Laura Gonzalez, GSA lecturer and artist 
 LD Beghtol, musician

References

Further reading
 Jacob Lund Fisker (2010) Early Retirement Extreme: A philosophical and practical guide to financial independence,

External links
 Official website

Biannual magazines published in the United Kingdom
Lifestyle magazines published in the United Kingdom
Online magazines published in the United Kingdom
Criticism of work
Defunct magazines published in the United Kingdom
Literature critical of work and the work ethic
Magazines established in 2007
Magazines disestablished in 2017
Online magazines with defunct print editions
Simple living
Works about labor